Márk Krajcsák (born 28 December 1983 in Budapest) is a former professional squash player who represented Hungary. In November 2008, his career-high world ranking was No. 37.

References

External links 
 
 

Hungarian squash players
Living people
1983 births
Sportspeople from Budapest
Competitors at the 2009 World Games